Dorothy K. Hall is a scientific researcher known for her studies on snow and ice, which she studies through a combination of satellite data and direct measurements. She is a fellow of the American Geophysical Union.

Education and career 
Hall grew up near Washington, D.C. and was interested in the space program, astronomy, and geology. By high school, she had her pilot's license and was taking photographs from planes. In college, she combined these interests to pursue a degree in geographic sciences at the University of Maryland. Hall also earned her Ph.D. from the University of Maryland where she combined field measurements and satellite data to measure aufeis in Alaska.

Hall was a scientist at the National Aeronautics and Space Agency's (NASA) Goddard Space Flight Center, where she served as a scientist in the hydrology division from 1975 until 2003, with a promotion to Senior Scientist in 1989. Hall worked in the cryospheric sciences laboratory at NASA where she led the Moderate Resolution Imaging Spectroradiometer snow and ice imaging program. After retiring from NASA, Hall spent two years at Michigan State University before taking a visiting scientist position at the University of Maryland.

In 2018, Hall was elected a fellow of the American Geophysical Union who cited her "for pioneering, innovative, and sustained research for 44 years on global remote sensing of the Earth's cryosphere".

Research 
Hall is known for her research measuring the temperature of the snow and sea, and mapping its spatial extent. While at NASA, Hall worked on the Moderate Resolution Imaging Spectroradiometer (MODIS) instruments on the Terra satellite where she focused on the measurements of snow from space. Hall has also used the MODIS instruments on Terra and Aqua to measure the temperature of the ice surface. Hall's research on the surface temperature and extent of ice melt in Greenland has revealed widespread melting of Greenland ice over short periods of time. Her work during field expeditions includes direct measurements of snow and ice, which increases confidence in measurements made from space. Hall's research includes tracking of annual changes in snow levels and the timing of melt in areas including Wyoming, California, and Great Salt Lake in Utah.

Selected publications

Awards and honors 
 Exceptional Service Medal, NASA (2009)
 Fellow, American Geophysical Union (2018)

References 

University System of Maryland alumni
University System of Maryland faculty
Fellows of the American Geophysical Union
NASA people
Living people
Women space scientists
Year of birth missing (living people)